Laura Isabella Lolita Osswald (born 8 March 1982) is a German stage, and television actress. She is known to have played in the television series Verliebt in Berlin and Schulmädchen.

Filmography 
 2002-2005: Schulmädchen : Cara de Boni
 2005–2007: Verliebt in Berlin : Hannah Refrath
 2008-2011: Doctor's Diary : Gabi Kragenow
 2013: "Fack ju Göhte"

External links

German television actresses
1982 births
Living people
Actresses from Munich
German stage actresses
21st-century German actresses